Brian Sorenson (13 November 1929 – 7 May 2009) was a New Zealand cricketer. He played twelve first-class matches for Auckland between 1955 and 1958.

See also
 List of Auckland representative cricketers

References

External links
 

1929 births
2009 deaths
New Zealand cricketers
Auckland cricketers
Cricketers from Auckland